Týniště may refer to places in the Czech Republic:

Týniště (Plzeň-South District), a municipality and village in the Plzeň Region
Týniště nad Orlicí, a town in the Hradec Králové Region
Týniště, a village and part of Malešov in the Central Bohemian Region
Týniště, a village and part of Verušičky in the Karlovy Vary Region
Týniště, a village and part of Zubrnice in the Ústí nad Labem Region